Virgin TV is a pay television service in the UK.

Virgin TV may also refer to:
 Virgin Plus TV, an over-the-top pay television and Internet bundle in Canada
 Virgin Media Ireland, a telecommunications company in Ireland providing Virgin TV pay television 
 Virgin Media Television, a broadcasting company in the Republic of Ireland
 Living TV Group, a defunct British broadcasting company formerly known as Virgin Media Television

Disambig-Class Media articles